Randal Plunkett may refer to:

 Randal Edward Sherborne Plunkett (born 1848), British Conservative politician
 Randal Plunkett, 19th Baron of Dunsany (born 1906), Irish peer and soldier
 Randal Plunkett, 21st Baron of Dunsany (born 1983), Irish film director and rewilding advocate